M. H. Khandaker was the first Attorney General of Bangladesh.

Career
Former chief adviser Latifur Rahman was Khandaker's apprentice when he was the Attorney General of Bangladesh.

Personal life
Khandaker's son,  AJ Mohammad Ali, was appointed the 12th Attorney General of Bangladesh.

References

Attorneys General of Bangladesh
20th-century Bangladeshi lawyers
20th-century Pakistani lawyers